Gozhan is a rural locality (a village) in Shagirtskoye Rural Settlement, Kuyedinsky District, Perm Krai, Russia. The population was 513 as of 2010. There are 9 streets.

Geography 
Gozhan is located 31 km northwest of Kuyeda (the district's administrative centre) by road. Novy Shagirt is the nearest rural locality.

References 

Rural localities in Kuyedinsky District